Psalm 27 is the 27th psalm of the Book of Psalms, beginning in English in the King James Version: "The LORD is my light and my salvation; whom shall I fear?". The Book of Psalms is part of the third section of the Hebrew Bible, and a book of the Christian Old Testament. In the slightly different numbering system used in the Greek Septuagint and Latin Vulgate translations of the Bible, this psalm is Psalm 26. In Latin, it is known as "Dominus illuminatio mea".

The psalm forms a regular part of Jewish, Catholic, Lutheran, Anglican and Nonconformist Protestant liturgies. It has been set to music by Marc-Antoine Charpentier and Frances Allitsen among others.

Text

Hebrew text 
The following table shows the Hebrew text of the Psalm with vowels alongside an English translation based upon the JPS 1917 translation (now in the public domain).

King James Bible translation 

 The LORD is my light and my salvation; whom shall I fear? the LORD is the strength of my life; of whom shall I be afraid?
 When the wicked, even mine enemies and my foes, came upon me to eat up my flesh, they stumbled and fell.
 Though an host should encamp against me, my heart shall not fear: though war should rise against me, in this will I be confident.
 One thing have I desired of the LORD, that will I seek after; that I may dwell in the house of the LORD all the days of my life, to behold the beauty of the LORD, and to enquire in his temple.
 For in the time of trouble he shall hide me in his pavilion: in the secret of his tabernacle shall he hide me; he shall set me up upon a rock.
 And now shall mine head be lifted up above mine enemies round about me: therefore will I offer in his tabernacle sacrifices of joy; I will sing, yea, I will sing praises unto the LORD.
 Hear, O LORD, when I cry with my voice: have mercy also upon me, and answer me.
 When thou sadist, Seek ye my face; my heart said unto thee, Thy face, LORD, will I seek.
 Hide not thy face far from me; put not thy servant away in anger: thou hast been my help; leave me not, neither forsake me, O God of my salvation.
 When my father and my mother forsake me, then the LORD will take me up.
 Teach me thy way, O LORD, and lead me in a plain path, because of mine enemies.
 Deliver me not over unto the will of mine enemies: for false witnesses are risen up against me, and such as breathe out cruelty.
 I had fainted, unless I had believed to see the goodness of the LORD in the land of the living.
 Wait on the LORD: be of good courage, and he shall strengthen thine heart: wait, I say, on the LORD.

Authorship
Tradition attributes Psalm 27 to King David. Some commentators claim that it is a composite work by at least two authors brought together by an editor. Protestant Christians have traditionally thought of it as written early in David's life, during his flight from King Saul, with Charles Spurgeon suggesting specifically the incident with Doeg the Edomite (1 Samuel 21–22).

Structure

Traditionally this Psalm is divided into two sections, verses 1–6 and 7–14. The first section declares the power of God and a boundless hope that God will bring rescue and protection from all enemies. The second portion has a clear shift in tone with the declaration "I believe". The New American Bible, Revised Edition, describes each part as "complete in itself". Some scholarship contends that it may have originally been two separate psalms.

In Hebrew the first three verses increase numerically: Two parallel phrases of five words each, then six, then seven, (hinting at completion in Jewish numerology).

The Psalm is a cry for help, and ultimately a declaration of belief in the greatness of God and trust in the protection God provides. It may be a sequel to the preceding psalm.

Uses

Judaism
 Many Sephardic communities recite this Psalm every weekday at the end of Shacharit.
In most Ashkenazic communities, it recited twice daily (in Shacharit, and either Mincha or Maariv) from Rosh Chodesh Elul to Shemini Atzeret (in Israel, until Hoshana Rabbah), a period of repentance based in the Midrash. This custom does not seem to be older than the 17th century, and in some communities it was never accepted, and some communities recite it in Shacharit only.
Verse 7 is found in the repetition of the Shacharit Amidah during Rosh Hashanah.
Verse 13 is found in the Mussaf Amidah on Rosh Hashanah.
Verse 14 is the opening of verses recited by some before Ein Keloheinu.

Catholicism
In the Roman Rite liturgy, this Psalm is recited, divided into its two parts, at Vespers on Wednesday of the first week of the four-week cycle, as well as being used often as a responsorial psalm at Mass.

A New Catholic Commentary on Holy Scripture says the first poem of which Psalm 27 is composed is an expression of confidence that God will bring help and of devotion to the Temple, and the second is a cry for help. Mary Kathleen Glavich's The Catholic Companion to the Psalms recounts how a woman wrote the first verses of Psalm 27 (boundless hope that God will bring rescue) on the wall of the brothel room where she was confined against her will. Pope John Paul II also spoke of the first part of the psalm as "marked by a deep tranquillity, based on trust in God on the dark day of the evildoers' assault". In the second part too, he said, "the decisive element is the trust of the person of prayer in the Lord", whose face the person seeks, an expression of "the mystical need of divine intimacy through prayer", an intimacy made possible even in this life through Christ.

Protestantism
Matthew Henry similarly saw the Psalm as a metaphor for the Christian life, that "whatever the Christian is as to this life, he considers the favour and service of God as the one thing needful..." while Spurgeon sees the Psalm as at once the language of David, but also descriptive of the Church, and Jesus. Calvin saw it more as a prayer of thankfulness and composure.

The late Dr Helen Roseveare, a medical missionary to the Congo, doctor and author, used Psalm 27:3 and seeking the beauty of God among her exhortation to persevere as part of her advice: "Here's one thing you should know, one thing you should do and one thing we should ask for to keep on keeping on" and considered it akin to Matthew 6:33, "Seek first the kingdom of heaven and his righteousness".

Book of Common Prayer
In the Church of England's Book of Common Prayer, this psalm, entitled Dominus illuminatio, is appointed to be read on the evening of the fifth day of the month.

Musical settings 
Heinrich Schütz wrote a setting of a metric paraphrase of Psalm 27 in German, "Mein Licht und Heil ist Gott der Herr", SWV 124, for the Becker Psalter, published first in 1628. Marc-Antoine Charpentier composed "Dominus illuminatio mea", H.229 in 1699 for soloists, chorus, strings and continuo.

Frances Allitsen composed a musical setting based on Psalm 27 for voice and piano called "The Lord is My Light," published in 1897.

Alan Hovhaness set portions of this psalm and Psalm 117 for his 1935 work The God of Glory Thundereth.

In popular culture 
The psalm is featured in the 2017 Western film Hostiles.

References

External links 

 
 
  in Hebrew and English - Mechon-mamre
 Text of Psalm 27 according to the 1928 Psalter
 The LORD is my light and my salvation; / whom should I fear? text and footnotes, usccb.org United States Conference of Catholic Bishops
 Psalm 27:1 introduction and text, biblestudytools.com
 Psalm 27 – The Seeking, Waiting Life Rewarded enduringword.com
 Psalm 27 / Refrain: The Lord is my light and my salvation. Church of England
 Psalm 27 at biblegateway.com
 Hymns for Psalm 27 hymnary.org
 Recordings of traditional tunes for verse 4 of the psalm, as well as Hebrew text for that verse

027
Elul
Works attributed to David